The China national football team (recognised as China PR by FIFA) represents the People's Republic of China in international association football and is governed by the Chinese Football Association.

China won the EAFF East Asian Cup in 2005 and 2010, was runner-up at the AFC Asian Cup in 1984 and 2004 and made its sole FIFA World Cup appearance in 2002, losing all matches without scoring a goal.

History

Republic of China (1913–1949)

China's first-ever international representative match was arranged by Elwood Brown, president of the Philippine Athletic Association, who proposed the creation of the Far Eastern Championship Games, a multi-sport event considered to be a precursor to the Asian Games. He invited China to participate in the inaugural 1913 Far Eastern Championship Games held in the Philippines, which included association football within the schedule. To represent them, it was decided that the winner of the football at the Chinese National Games in 1910 should have the honour to represent the country, where it was won by South China Football Club. The club's founder and coach Mok Hing (Chinese 莫慶) would become China's first coach and on 4 February 1913 in a one-off tournament game held in the Manila he led China to a 2–1 defeat against the Philippines national football team.

The political unrest of the Xinhai Revolution that mired China's participation in the first tournament, especially in renaming the team as Republic of China national football team, did not stop Shanghai being awarded the 1915 Far Eastern Championship Games. Once again South China Football Club, now known as South China Athletic Association won the right to represent the nation. This time in a two legged play-off against the Philippines, China won the first game 1–0 and then drew the second 0–0 to win their first ever tournament. With the games being the first and only regional football tournament for national teams outside Britain, China looked to establish themselves as a regional powerhouse by winning a total of nine championships.

The Chinese Football Association was founded in 1924 and then was first affiliated with FIFA in 1931. With these foundations in place China looked to establish themselves within the international arena and along with Japan were the first Asian sides to participate in the Football at the Summer Olympics when they competed within the 1936 Summer Olympics held in Germany. At the tournament China were knocked out within their first game at the round of 16 when they were beaten by Great Britain Olympic football team 2–0 on 6 August 1936.

On 7 July 1937 the Second Sino-Japanese War officially erupted, which saw the relations between China and Japan completely eroded especially once it was announced that Japan would hold the 1938 Far Eastern Championship Games. The tournament would be officially cancelled while Japan held their own tournament called the 2600th Anniversary of the Japanese Empire, which included the Japanese puppet states Manchukuo and the collaborationist National Reorganised Government of China based in occupied Nanjing. But none of the top Chinese players competed in the Japanese Empire anniversary games. None of the games during the Second Sino-Japanese War are officially recognized and once the war ended on 9 September 1945 China looked to the Olympics once again for international recognition. On 2 August 1948 China competed in the Football at the 1948 Summer Olympics where they were once again knocked out in the last sixteen, this time by Turkey national football team in a 4–0 defeat. When the players returned they found the country in the midst of the Chinese Civil War. When it ended, the team had been split into two, one called the People's Republic of China national football team and the other called Republic of China national football team (later renamed Chinese Taipei national football team).

Early People's Republic (1950–1976) 
The newly instated People's Republic of China reformed CFA before having FIFA acknowledge their 1931 membership on 14 June 1952. Finland, who were one of the first nations to hold diplomatic relations with China's new government, invited the country to take part in the 1952 Summer Olympics. Li Fenglou would become the country's first permanent manager to lead them in the tournament, however the Chinese delegation was delayed and they missed the entire competition, nevertheless the Finland national football team would still greet Li and the Chinese team with a friendly game on 4 August 1952 making it People's Republic of China's official first game, which ended in a 4–0 defeat. In preparation for entering their first FIFA competition, China sent a young squad to train in Hungary in 1954. However, when they entered the 1958 FIFA World Cup qualification process China were knocked out by Indonesia.

On 7 June 1958, China stopped participating within any FIFA recognised football events when FIFA officially started to recognise the Republic of China as a different country. This sparked a diplomatic argument that had already seen China withdraw from the 1956 Summer Olympics for the same reasons. For years the People's Republic of China would only play in friendlies with nations who recognized them as the sole heir to the China name. On 25 October 1971 the United Nations would recognise the People's Republic country as the sole heir to the China name in their General Assembly Resolution 2758 act. Due to this hearing in 1973, the Nationalist Chinese team, which had been using the name "Republic of China", would stop using that name and would eventually rename themselves as "Chinese Taipei" in 1980. These acts would see China rejoin the international sporting community, first by becoming a member of the Asian Football Confederation in 1974 and by rejoining FIFA again in 1979.

1980–2009: an Asian powerhouse
The 1974 Asian Games reintroduced the team back into international football while the 1976 AFC Asian Cup saw them came third.

In 1980, China participated in the 1982 FIFA World Cup qualifiers for a berth in the 1982 World Cup, but they lost a play-off game against New Zealand. During the 1986 FIFA World Cup qualifiers for the 1986 World Cup, China faced Hong Kong at home in the final match of the first qualifying round on 19 May 1985 where China only needed a draw to advance. However, Hong Kong produced a 2–1 upset win which resulted in riots inside and outside the stadium in Beijing. During the 1990 FIFA World Cup qualifiers, China again reached the final round. They just missed out on qualifying as they conceded two goals in the final three minutes against Qatar in their final group match. During the 1994 FIFA World Cup qualifiers – when they were led by their first ever foreign manager, Klaus Schlapner – China failed to reach the final round of qualifying, coming second behind Iraq.

In 1987, the first Chinese footballers moved abroad when future national team player Xie Yuxin joined FC Zwolle (Netherlands) and ex-national teamer Gu Guangming joined SV Darmstadt 98 (Germany). In 1988, national team captain Jia Xiuquan and striker Liu Haiguang both joined FK Partizan (Yugoslavia).

After failing to reach the 1998 FIFA World Cup, China appointed Serbian manager Bora Milutinović as coach of the national team, and China saw its fortune increased. The country managed to take fourth-place finish in the 2000 AFC Asian Cup where the Chinese side performed well, and only fell to heavyweights Japan and South Korea by one goal margin. The good performance in Lebanon boosted the confidence of Chinese side, and in 2002 FIFA World Cup qualifiers, China lost only one and drew only one, winning all the remaining games, most notably an important 1–0 win over Oman, to finally reach the 2002 FIFA World Cup, its first and only World Cup up to date. In the 2002 World Cup, China was eliminated after three matches without gaining a single point nor even scoring a goal during their participation in the tournament.

China hosted the 2004 AFC Asian Cup, ultimately fell 1–3 to Japan in a final match. The match's outcome sparked anger among Chinese supporters, who rioted in response to bad refereeing. There were an estimated 250 million viewers for the match, the largest single-event sports audience in the country's history at that time.

After winning the 2005 East Asian Football Championship following a 2–0 win against North Korea, they started qualification for the 2007 AFC Asian Cup. During this time, the team became the subject of immense criticism and national embarrassment in the media when they had managed to score only one goal, Shao Jiayi's penalty kick during injury time, against Singapore at home and only managed a draw with Singapore in the away game. During preparations for the 2007 AFC Asian Cup, the team spent the weeks leading up to the tournament on a tour of the United States. While the 4–1 loss to the United States was unexpected, a 1–0 loss to Major League Soccer side Real Salt Lake which finished bottom of the league in the 2007 season caused serious concern.

During the 2007 AFC Asian Cup, the team played three group matches, winning against Malaysia, drawing with Iran after leading 2–1, and losing 3–0 to Uzbekistan. After high expectations, China's performance at the tournament drew criticism online which condemned the team's members and even the association. Zhu was later replaced as manager by Vladimir Petrović after these performances. Some commented that China's reliance on foreign managers for the past decade had been an indicator of its poor domestic manager development.

In June 2008, China failed to qualify for the 2010 FIFA World Cup, losing against Qatar and Iraq at home. After the 2008 Summer Olympics, Petrović was sacked as the manager and Yin Tiesheng was announced as the team's caretaker.

2010–present: stagnation

Gao Hongbo era
In April 2009, China appointed Gao Hongbo as the new manager, replacing Yin Tiesheng. His arrival saw China opt for a new strategy, turning towards ground passing tactics and adopting the 4–2–3–1 formation. It was noted that Chinese footballers had relied too heavily on the long ball tactic for almost a decade. Wei Di, the chief of the Chinese Football Association, stressed that, "Anytime, no matter win or loss, they must show their team spirit and courage. I hope, after one year's effort, the national team can give the public a new image." Gao was knocked out of the 2011 AFC Asian Cup's group stage. His winning percentage (65%), the highest for a Chinese manager since Nian Weisi (67.86%), did not defer the Chinese Football Association from replacing him with José Antonio Camacho in August 2011, less than a month before the qualification process for the 2014 FIFA World Cup.

Appointment of José Antonio Camacho
On 13 August 2011, José Antonio Camacho was appointed as the new manager of the team, signing a three-year deal for a reported annual salary of $8 million. Wei Di, CFA chief, explained the decision as being part of a long-term plan to help the country catch up with rivals Japan and South Korea. He noted that, "Compared with our neighbours Japan and South Korea, Chinese football is lagging far behind, we need to work with a long-term view and start to catch up with a pragmatic approach. A lot of our fans expect China to qualify for the 2014 World Cup finals in Brazil. They are afraid that changing the coach at the last moment may cause bad effect to the team's qualifying prospect. I can totally understand that. But we do not have any time to waste."

Yu Hongchen, the vice-president of the Chinese Football Administrative Centre, also stated, "The qualifying stage of 2014 World Cup is just a temporary task for him. Even if the task is failed, Camacho will not lose the job. When we started to find a new coach for the national team, we mainly focus on European countries such as Germany, the Netherlands and Spain. First of all, they have advanced football concepts, and secondly they have a productive youth training system, which we can learn from. We hope he can help us to find a suitable style."

Camacho managed a team to an 8–0 loss against Brazil on 10 September 2012 which would go on record as China's biggest ever international defeat. This massive loss also succumbed China to their worst ever FIFA ranking (109th).

Camacho led China during their qualification process for the 2015 AFC Asian Cup whereby losing the first group match 2–1 to Saudi Arabia. After a 5–1 loss against Thailand in a friendly, Camacho sacked a week as manager with Fu Bo assigned as the caretaker.

Alain Perrin and Gao Hongbo returns

After Camacho, there was Alain Perrin, who finally led China to qualify for the 2015 AFC Asian Cup, which also included luck from the Thailand–Lebanon encounter, in which Thailand lost but salvaged an important goal by Adisak Kraisorn to help improve China's goal difference with the Lebanese. Soon after that, Perrin led China into a series of friendlies, where some positive results against Macedonia, Kuwait, Paraguay and Thailand boosted some optimism.

In the 2015 Asian Cup, Perrin's China was placed in a group with Saudi Arabia, Uzbekistan and North Korea. China emerged victoriously in all three games, qualified for the knockout stage for the first time since the 2004 edition. The Chinese Dragons then lost to host Australia 0–2 with Tim Cahill scoring a brace.

Despite this, China's 2018 FIFA World Cup qualifiers immediately represented a huge problem for the Chinese side; they were held goalless by Hong Kong at home twice, and lost to Qatar. Perrin was sacked for the team's poor performance at the middle of the second round following another goalless draw to Hong Kong, and former coach Gao Hongbo returned to the role on 3 February 2016, where he had to face a task of guiding China in at the expense of North Korea which had a better second-place ranking than China. Gao's first two matches were consecutive wins against Maldives and Qatar, and with North Korea suddenly slipping out against the Philippines, these results secured the team's passage to the 2019 AFC Asian Cup and entering the final qualifying stage for the World Cup.

China continued their World Cup hunt by a 2–3 defeat to South Korea; and a goalless draw to AFC's then highest ranked Iran at home. However, China followed that with a 0–1 loss at home to Syria and 0–2 away to Uzbekistan next month. Gao Hongbo resigned. His team had been winless in the first four matches of the final qualifying stage for the World Cup, including a home loss to Syria which was criticised by a number of fans.

Lippi's tenure
 
On 22 October 2016, Marcello Lippi was appointed manager of the team ahead for the last remaining matches. A match saw China defeat South Korea for the first time in a FIFA-sanctioned tournament, amidst the heat of tensions over South Korea's deployment of THAAD. However, China's away loss to Iran and a 2–2 draw to Syria meant China was unable to compete with and dragged behind by Syria who managed a 2–2 draw with Iran and not to be qualified for the 2018 World Cup under Lippi's tenure, but improvements could be seen following two late wins over Uzbekistan and Qatar.

Lippi led the side during the final stage of the 2019 AFC Asian Cup, where China won 2–1 to Kyrgyzstan and 3–0 to Philippines, before losing 2–0 to group leaders South Korea on 16 January. China then beat Thailand 2–1 to earn a place in the quarter-finals, where it was knocked 3–0 out by Iran; Lippi subsequently confirmed his departure.

Another Italian, Fabio Cannavaro was appointed as the next China's manager in conjunction with coaching Guangzhou Evergrande but he stepped down after only two matches.

Lacked of option in searching for a new coach, CFA reappointed Marcello Lippi. To improve the team, China had begun a series of naturalization on foreign-based players, with Nico Yennaris, an English-born Cypriot, and Tyias Browning, another English-born player, being naturalized. Subsequently, Elkeson, a Brazilian player with no Chinese ancestry, was naturalized. Despite the process of naturalization, the 2022 FIFA World Cup qualification for China proved to be rockier than expected, the team could only beat the Maldives and Guam, before being held goalless in the Philippines and followed with a denting 1–2 away loss to Syria, and Lippi resigned as coach.

Li Tie's era
2002 FIFA World Cup ace Li Tie was appointed as China's head coach on 2 January 2020. Trailing behind Syria by five points before Li took charge, China were still unable to reclaim their first place but nonetheless managed to win all of their remaining fixtures, including an important 2–0 win over the Philippines and notably a 3–1 win over Syria to guarantee them as the best second-placed team, thus reaching the third round.

In the third round, China shared Group B with Asian powerhouses Japan, Australia and Saudi Arabia, alongside Oman and Vietnam. The Chinese started poorly with two losses to Australia and Japan in Doha due to the COVID-19 pandemic at home preventing the country from hosting. After this poor start, China salvaged five points in the next four matches, including a hard-fought 3–2 win over Vietnam and two 1–1 draws to Oman and especially Australia, all occurring in Sharjah, the UAE. However, despite these improvements, Li Tie was sacked on 2 December 2021 amidst heavy criticism.

Li Xiaopeng's era
After Li Tie's resignation, his World Cup teammate Li Xiaopeng took the head coach position with immense pressure. China's first game under Li Xiaopeng, however, was a 0–2 away loss to Japan in Saitama, effectively ending China's hopes of finishing in the top two and could only rely on the play-offs. Yet, on 1 February 2022, coinciding with the traditional Lunar New Year in China, the Chinese stumbled to a shock 1–3 away loss to Vietnam in Hanoi, officially extending China's hunt for a second World Cup appearance to 24 years. This agonising defeat, the first in Chinese football history to its southern neighbour on a special day for both nations, triggered widespread public criticism and condemnation among Chinese fans. With their World Cup hopes completely lost, China grabbed a solitary point coming from a 1–1 draw with the Saudis before losing to Oman 0–2 in Muscat, finishing fifth with two more points than Vietnam.

After poor forms in the 2022 FIFA World Cup qualifiers, China took part in the 2022 EAFF E-1 Football Championship under interim manager Aleksandar Janković. Within the leadership of the Serbian, China won four points, finishing third after a 1–0 win over Hong Kong, though for the first time in 12 years, China did not lose to Japan away.

Team image 

The team is colloquially termed "Dragon's Team", "Team China", the "National Team" or "Guózú" (short for ).

China's home kit is traditionally all-red with a white or yellow trim while their away kit is traditionally an inverted version of the home kit, fully white with a red trim. During the 1996 AFC Asian Cup, China employed a third kit which was all blue with a white trim and was used against Saudi Arabia during the tournament. The team has also started to use cooling vests in certain warmer climates. After decades of having Adidas producing the team's kits, China's current kit has been produced and manufactured by Nike since 2015.

Rivalries

Japan 

China's rivalry with Japan was exemplified after their 3–1 defeat in the 2004 AFC Asian Cup Final on home soil. The subsequent rioting by Chinese fans at the Workers' Stadium was said to be provoked by controversial officiating during the tournament and the heightened anti-Japanese sentiment at the time.

South Korea 

Another rivalry is with neighbour South Korea who China played 27 matches against between 1978 and 2010, without winning a single match. The media coined the term "Koreaphobia" to describe this phenomenon, but China finally registered its first win against South Korea on 10 February 2010, winning 3–0 during the 2010 East Asian Football Championship and eventually going on to win the tournament.

Hong Kong 

A rivalry with Hong Kong has been created due to political tensions as well as issues during 2018 World Cup qualification. With Hong Kong fans booing the Chinese national anthem, which Hong Kong share with China, 2018 World Cup qualifier matches were also very tense with both matches resulting in 0–0 draws.

Uzbekistan 
The rivalry with Uzbekistan is just a recent development, but also stemmed from previous results which saw China suffered shock defeats to the hand of Uzbekistan in several competitive football games. The two nations first met each other in the final for the 1994 Asian Games, where Uzbekistan, with a squad depleted due to the collapse of the Soviet Union, stunned China with a 4–2 win to claim gold in Uzbekistan's debut in any major football tournament; the game had been accused of match-fixing, though evidence have yet to emerge. This was soon repeated again in the 1996 AFC Asian Cup, which was Uzbekistan's debut in a major competitive football tournament, which China suffered a blowing 0–2 defeat to the Uzbeks, with both goals scored in the dying times right in what would be Uzbekistan's first-ever Asian Cup fixture. Since then, Uzbekistan has frequently become a problematic opponent for China, with China often lost more than won in competitive games against the Uzbeks. China has never beaten Uzbekistan in Uzbek soil, with all two visiting trips ended in defeats for the Chinese.

India 
China and India have shared cultural and economic relations that date back to ancient period, but the rivalry between the two Asian sides is developed during the recent times due to the intense bilateral relations from the Sino-Indian war and border disputes. With seven wins and four draws, China has been the dominant side in this rivalry. In October 2018, the rivalry was popularized as the 'Earth Derby' by media in a friendly since the two nations shared one-third of the world's population.

Results and fixtures

The following is a list of match results in the last 12 months, as well as any future matches that have been scheduled.

2022

2023

 1 : Non FIFA 'A' international match

Coaching staff

Coaching history

1930–1948

1951–present

Players

Current squad 
The following players were called up for the 2022 EAFF E-1 Football Championship matches against South Korea, Japan, and Hong Kong on 20, 24, and 27 July 2022 respectively.

Caps and goals are correct as of 27 July 2022, after the match against Hong Kong.

Recent call-ups 
The following players have also been called up to the squad within the last twelve months.

INJ Withdrew due to injury
PRE Preliminary squad
RET Retired from the national team
SUS Serving suspension

Individual records 
.
Players in bold are still active with China.

Most appearances

Top goalscorers

Manager records 
 Most manager appearances
  Gao Fengwen: 56

Team records 
 Biggest victory
 19–0 vs. Guam, 26 January 2000

Competitive record

FIFA World Cup

China has only appeared at one World Cup with the appearance being in the 2002 FIFA World Cup where they finished bottom of the group which included a 4–0 loss to Brazil.

AFC Asian Cup

Summer Olympics

For 1992 to 2016, see China national under-23 football team

Asian Games

* Including 1998 onwards (until 2010)

For 2002  to 2018, see China national under-23 football team

EAFF East Asian Cup

Head-to-head record
As of 27 July 2022 after match against

1913–1923 

All matches before the founding of Chinese Football Association in 1924 are not counted as A-level match by FIFA:

Honours

Continental
AFC Asian Cup
Runners-up (2): 1984, 2004
Third place (2): 1976, 1992
Asian Games
Silver medal (1): 1994
Bronze medal (2): 1978, 1998

Regional
EAFF E-1 Football Championship
Winners (2): 2005, 2010
 Runners-up (2): 2013, 2015
Third place (5): 2003, 2008, 2017, 2019, 2022
Dynasty Cup
Runners-up (2): 1990, 1998
Far Eastern Games
Winners (9): 1915, 1917, 1919, 1921, 1923, 1925, 1927, 1930 (shared), 1934
Runners-up (1): 1913

Minor tournaments
 China Cup
Third place (1): 2017
 Dunhill Cup
Winners (1): 1997
Runners-up (1): 1999
 Four Nations Tournament
Winners (2): January 2000, September 2000
Third place (1): 2001
 King's Cup
Winners (1): 1993
Runners-up (1): 2001
Third place (1): 1980 (shared)
 Kirin Cup
Third place (1): 1984 (shared)
 Lunar New Year Cup
Winners (1): 1978
Runners-up (2): 1989, 1990
 Merlion Cup
Winners (1): 1986
Third place (1): 1983
 Nehru Cup
Runners-up (4): 1982, 1983, 1984, 1986
Third place (1): 1997

See also

Sport in China
Football in China
Women's football in China
China national football B team
China national under-23 football team
China national under-20 football team
China national under-17 football team
China national futsal team
China national under-20 futsal team
China national beach soccer team
China women's national football team

Notes

References

External links

  
Team China on Sina Sports 
Profile on FIFA
Profile on AFC
Profile on EAFF
 

 
Asian national association football teams